Fengshan County (zhuang: Fonghsan Yen) is a county of Guangxi, China. It is under the administration of Hechi City.

Administrative divisions
Fengshan has one town, Fengcheng, and ten townships:
Paoli (袍里乡)
Zhaiya (砦牙乡)
Changzhou (长洲乡)
Qiaoyin (乔音乡)
Lintong (林峒乡)
Jinya (金牙瑶族乡)
Gengsha (更沙乡)
Zhongting (中亭乡)
Pingle (平乐瑶族乡)
Jiangzhou (江洲瑶族乡)

Geography 
Fengshan County is located in the northwest of Guangxi. The county takes its name from the shape of the mountain range in this region, which resembles a phoenix spreading its wings.
The county is situated on a variety of geological formations, including karst, which is a landscape formed from the dissolution of soluble rocks—including limestone, dolomite and gypsum—and is characterized by sinkholes, caves and underground drainage systems. Karst is a rare formation seen in only a few locations worldwide.

Geographic features
Fengshan County lies on the eastern fringe of the Yunnan-Guizhou Plateau and the terrain follows a northwest to southeast direction. 70% of the area, is covered by karst and arable land. The area has a subtropical monsoon climate with an average yearly temperature of 20 degrees Celsius.

Climate

Mineral resources
Fengshan County possesses mineral resources such as gold, pyrite, sulphur, limonite and copper. The pyrite reserves are estimated to be about 7,083 tons with an average grade of 17%.

Karst resources
Fengshan has been described as the "kingdom of karst and the city of caves." There are more than 20 karst land formations such as huge caves, underground rivers, depressions, karst poljes, and sinkholes. According to statistics, there are 50 caves with chambers having an area of more than 2000 square meters and 19 caves with chambers that have an area that exceeds 10,000 square meters.

The largest caves are the Jiangzhou Underground Corridor, Mawangdong Cave and Gatundong Cave.

Jiangzhou Underground Corridor consists of many smaller caves, shafts and underground rivers. The cave was developed in the Permian Period.

Jiangzhou Underground Corridor is rich in curly crystals, vast sparkling terraces, and colossal stalactites and stalagmites. It has 25 caverns, each having an area of between 4000-18500 square meters.

Landforms

Mawangdong Cave
Mawangdong Cave consists of three layers. The lower layer is an underground river channel. A karst sinkhole known as a "Tiankeng" lies at the southern section of the cave.
  Its mouth has a tri-corner shape with rounded corners measuring 225 m×180 m. The vegetation there is verdurous. The cave is named "Mawangdong", which literally means "Horse King Cave", since the cave entrance resembles a horse's mouth.
This cave is a neighbor to Sanmenhai Cave and the two are connected by an underground river.

Xixili Cave
This cave contains flowstones, cave flags, hanging curtains, and cave crystals.

Jiangzhou Natural Bridge

Yuanyang Springs
In the name "Yuan-yang", the words yuan and yang stand for male and female Mandarin Ducks, respectively. In symbolic representations, Mandarin Ducks always appear as a male and female pair and are seen to represent fidelity.

The Yuanyang Springs consist of two springs; the water of each spring has a distinctive color: one is a clear green, the other is turbid blue. Chemical analysis of their waters has shown that the composition is the same. The springs are approximately the same size. The surface pool is a rounded three-corner shape with a baseline of 21 meters and height of 30 meters. At certain times of the year, the water backflows.

Peak-cluster depressions
The term "Karst Fengcong" or karst peak cluster is a term created by Chinese scholars to classify karst by the hill or peak density. The term "Peak-cluster depression" describes the land form that combines peak-clusters and closed depressions, which are the two basic features of Fengcong.

The beauty of Fengshan's sublime, unique, and precipitous valleys is created by towering, imposing peaks and low-lying depressions.

References

External links 

 

Counties of Guangxi
Administrative divisions of Hechi